Duety do mety (Duos to finish line) was the Polish version of The Mad Dash. The show was broadcast from 1998 to 2000. It was hosted by actor Mirosław Siedler.

Rules
The rules were roughly the same as the original version. Only the prizes were different in original show.

Polish game shows

pl:Teleturnieje nadawane w TVP2#Duety do mety